Lemanea is a genus of freshwater red algae, in the order Batrachospermales. Both species are considered to be widespread in the northern hemisphere. Although placed in the Rhodophyta (red algae) it in fact is green in colour.

Description
Lemanea is a stiff bristle-like branched or unbranched alga similar to a coarse horsehair. Close inspection show it to have small swellings at more or less regular intervals along its length. It grows to 40 cm in length, in bunches in freshwater. It is blue-green to olive in colour when young. The asexual stage is a row of single-celled branched filaments.

Species
World-wide nine species are listed in algaebase:- 
 Lemanea borealis Atkinson
 Lemanea ciliata (Sirodot) De Toni
 Lemanea condensata Israelson
 Lemanea fluviatilis (Linnaeus) C. Agardh
 Lemanea fucina Bory de Saint-Vincent
 Lemanea fucina var. parva M.L.Vis & R.G. Sheath
 Lemanea mamillosa Kützing
 Lemanra rigida (Sirodot) De toni
 Laminea sinca C.C. Jac
 Lemanea sudeica Kützing

Taxonomy
The genus name of Lemanea is in honour of Dominique Sébastien Léman (1781-1829), who was an Italian-French botanist (interested in Pteridology, Algology and Mycology) and also Mineralogy.

The genus was circumscribed by Jean Baptiste Bory de St. Vincent in Ann. Mus. Hist. Nat. (Paris) vol.12 on page 178 in 1808.

Distribution
The genus is considered to be cosmopolitan in the northern hemisphere.

Europe

United Kingdom
There are two species in the British Isles:-
 Lemanea fluviatilis (L.) C.Ag.
 Lemanea fucina Bory

Ireland
The records of this genus in Ireland are few with only three historic records from the north of Ireland in the Ulster Museum Herbarium (BEL). One collected by William Thompson in 1839; one collected by W. Sawers in 1856 and one collected in 1884 by H.W.Lett. These seem to be the earliest records from the north of Ireland. A more recent specimen collected in 1959 by Miss M.P.H. Kertland near Dungiven, Co. Londonderry is also preserved. A further 16 specimens were collected recently, that is within the last 50 years and have been added to the collection - all from Northern Ireland. They have also one foreign specimen collected from the Faroes.
A Lemanea species was found on slabs in the rapidly flowing streams in the NW of the Island of Mull.
In 2007, Lemanea fucina has been reported from Clare Island.

North America
In North America two species in this genus are listed.
 Lemanea borealis Atkinson
 Lemanea fluviatilis (Linnaeus) C.Agardh
 Lemanea fucina var. parva M.L. Vis & R.G. Sheath

References

General references
 John, D.M., Whitton, B.A. and Brook, A.J. (Ed.) 2002. The Freshwater Algal Flora of the British Isles. Cambridge University Press.
 Morton, O. 1978. Lemanea in the north of Ireland. Irish Naturalists' Journal 19: 205.
 Sawers, W. 1854. List of algae gathered in the north of Ireland. Naturalist, Morris 4: 254 - 257.
 West, G.S. and Fritsch, F.E. 1927. A Treatise on the British Freshwater Algae. Cambridge University Press, Cambridge. [Facsimile edition printed in 1968 as Vol. 3 of Bibliotheca Phycologia. J.Cramer, Lehre.]

Further reading
 Scannell, M.J.P. 1977. Localities in Cork East for Lemanea sp. (Rhodophycea) Ir. Nat. J. 19: 25.

External links
 algaebase.org

Batrachospermales
Red algae genera